Dhoraji is one of the 182 Legislative Assembly constituencies of Gujarat state in India. It is part of Rajkot district, and is one of the 8 assembly seats under Porbandar.

List of segments
This assembly seat represents the following segments,

 Upleta Taluka .
 Dhoraji Taluka

Members of Legislative Assembly 

2009^ (by-poll) - Jayesh Radadiya, after his father Vitthal Radadiya became an MP and gave up his Vidhan Saha seat  
2012 - Vitthalbhai Radadiya, Congress
 Vitthalbhai Radadiya joined BJP soon after the 2012 election and resigned from the assembly
2013^ (by-poll)

Election results

2022

2017

2013

2012

See also
 List of constituencies of the Gujarat Legislative Assembly
 Rajkot district
 Gujarat Legislative Assembly

References

External links
 

Assembly constituencies of Gujarat
Rajkot district